Nicola Donazzan (born 8 January 1985) is an Italian footballer who plays for Eurotezze as a defender.

Club career
Donazzan started his career with Internazionale, being later sold to Mantova in a co-ownership bid for a peppercorn fee of €500. He made a total 17 appearances during his three-year-long stay with the virgiliani. In July 2007, after Mantova made his transfer permanent for free, he was loaned out to Sassuolo, where he was protagonist of the neroverdi's successful Serie C1/A campaign. That season Donazzan was a utility player, who played in centre-back and left-back positions. However, he did not play in Supercoppa di Lega di Prima Divisione. Later in June 2008 Sassuolo decided to make his move became a co-ownership deal.

Donazzan signed a new 1-year deal on 22 June 2011.

References

1985 births
Living people
Italian footballers
Mantova 1911 players
U.S. Sassuolo Calcio players
Association football defenders
Sportspeople from the Province of Vicenza
Footballers from Veneto